Plaka is an old historical neighbourhood of Athens, Greece.

Plaka or Plakas may also refer to:

Places 
 Plaka Bridge, stone one-arch bridge in Greece
 Plaka (Mysia), a town of ancient Mysia, now in Turkey
 Plaka, Achaea
 Plaka, Arcadia, a village in Arcadia
 Plaka, Chania, a village in the Chania regional unit, Crete
 Plaka, Lasithi, a village in Lasithi, Crete
 Plaka, Lemnos, a village in Lemnos, Greece
 Plaka, Milos, the chief town in Greek island Milos
 Plaka, Pieria

Surname 
  (born 1983), comic artist
 Marina Lambraki-Plaka
 Demetra Plakas (born 1960), American musician

See also 
 Plaka Pilipino, a Filipino record label of Vicor Music Corporation